The 1916 Chester by-election for the United Kingdom constituency was held on 29 February 1916.  The by-election was held due to the resignation of the incumbent Conservative MP, Robert Yerburgh.  It was won by the Conservative candidate Sir Owen Philipps, who had previously been a Liberal MP.  Phillips was unopposed.

References

1916 elections in the United Kingdom
1916 in England
20th century in Cheshire
By-elections to the Parliament of the United Kingdom in Cheshire constituencies
Unopposed by-elections to the Parliament of the United Kingdom (need citation)
History of Chester